Dichanthelium sphaerocarpon, also called Panicum polyanthes, common name round-seed panic grass, is a plant found in North America. It is listed as endangered in Michigan. Dichanthelium sphaerocarpon var. isophyllum is listed as a special concern and believed extirpated in Connecticut.

References

sphaerocarpon
Grasses of North America